RDMA may refer to:

 Remote direct memory access, in computing
 Radio Disney Music Awards, an annual musical awards ceremony
 Royal Dutch Medical Association, in the Netherlands